Brett Robinson may refer to:

Brett Robinson (rugby union) (born 1970), Australian rugby union player and executive
Brett Robinson (runner) (born 1991), Australian distance runner